Villa College is a tertiary education and training institute established by the chairman of Villa Group, Hon. Qasim Ibrahim to offer educational opportunities to Maldivians at an affordable price in the country. With the aim, Villa College began its historic journey on the 28th of January 2007, with the registration of its first institute, Villa Institute of Water Sports followed by the Villa Institute of Information Technology (VIIT) and Villa Institute of Hospitality and Tourism Studies. In 2016 Villa College started to conduct business and management programs in affiliation with University of the West of England.

History 
Villa College commenced its first program early October 2007 with a total number of twenty students. Since then, the student numbers have grown steadily and today over three thousand students, learning various disciplines, are enrolled. Although Villa College started its operations in October 2007 under the Faculty of Computing and Business Management, all academic courses began in July 2008.

Campuses 

Villa College currently consist of six campuses; QI campus, Green Campus, Knowledge Village Fuvahmulah Campus, Lakeside Campus & Eydhafushi Campus.

QI Campus 
Villa College Qasim Ibrahim (QI) campus is the central operation of Villa College. It is located at the heart of Male’ City in Central Business District surrounded by several government and private offices and amenities.

The QI campus is designed to be environmentally friendly with a huge rose garden, an alley of orchids and neatly trimmed grass all across the horizon.

All the central administration, faculties and teaching are carried out in QI campus.

Fuvahmulah campus 
Villa College Fuvahmulaku Campus is located in Gn. Fuvahmulaku. This campus runs Villa College courses from Certificate level to master's degree level. The campus has fully air conditioned classrooms with state of art multimedia facilities. A modern computer lab is as well available for students.

Lakeside Campus 
Villa College Lakeside Campus (VCLC) is located in Shaviyani Funadhoo at a very picturesque location. The campus is surrounded by a beautiful lake with several domesticated animals across the lake. The campus offers certificate level and degree foundation programs and is expected to offer degree programs from 2014 onwards. State of art modern class rooms and facilities are available for the students studying in VCLC

Eydhafushi Campus 
Villa College Eydhafushi Campus (VCEC) is located in Baa Eydhafushi delivering certificate levels to degree level courses. In 2015 VCEC will commence delivering master's degree programs. The campus is located in the historic Bahiyya land and also operates Bahiyya pre-school as part of Villa College.

Other campuses 

 Villa College Mahibadhoo Campus
 Villa College Naifaru Campus
 Villa College Gan Campus
 Villa College Hithadhoo Campus

Faculties and institutes 
Teaching and learning at Villa College is organized and coordinated by a number of faculties, institutes and centres.

Notable alumni 

Ahmed Ahsan, Diver, PADI World instructor, Admiral, MNDF Marines, Esteemed Lawyer (Al-usthaaz) [updated as of November 2020]

References

Schools in the Maldives
Universities in the Maldives
Education in the Maldives
Educational organisations based in the Maldives
Educational institutions established in 2007
2007 establishments in the Maldives